Oxygyne is a genus of plant in family Burmanniaceae, first described as a genus in 1906. It has a highly disjunct distribution, found in Japan in East Asia and in Cameroon in Central Africa.

Species
 Oxygyne hyodoi C.Abe & Akasawa - Ehime on Shikoku Island in Japan
 Oxygyne shinzatoi (Hatus.) C.Abe & Akasawa - Nansei-shoto (Ryukyu Islands) in Japan
 Oxygyne triandra Schltr. - Cameroon 
 Oxygyne yamashitae Yahara & Tsukaya - Yaku-shima in Japan

References

Dioscoreales genera
Burmanniaceae
Parasitic plants
Taxonomy articles created by Polbot